Kolonia Bechcice  is a village in the administrative district of Gmina Lutomiersk, within Pabianice County, Łódź Voivodeship, in central Poland.

The village has a population of 280.

References

Kolonia Bechcice